Fille may refer to:
Fillé, a commune in France

See also

 File (disambiguation)
 Fili, historically a member of an elite class of poets in Ireland
 Filly, a young female horse